During 8–9 March 2023, the Allied Democratic Forces (ADF) carried out a massacre in the village of Mukondi in North Kivu in the Democratic Republic of the Congo.

Background
The ADF is a Ugandan Islamist group who in 1996 began their insurgency, including a massacre in 1998 in Kabarole District in the Western Region, Uganda. They later spread to the Democratic Republic of the Congo, killing thousands of civilians, including a massacre in Beni in 2016. Since the late 2010s, the ADF are aligned with Islamic State. In North Kivu, in the northeast of the DRC, in January 2023, the ADF carried out massacres in Kasindi and Makugwe.

Massacre
During the night of 8–9 March 2023, the ADF used machetes to carry out a massacre in Mukondi, a village in North Kivu. Locals claimed that the attackers "came in a group, like visitors", until they began attacking people with machetes. The assailants attacked while villagers were celebrating International Women's Day, using machetes to kill over 30 people in Mukondi before killing several others in the nearby village of Mausa. The ADF also set fire to 15 houses and a clinic. Seventeen people were taken to hospital. Initially, the provincial governor of Kivu region Carly Nsanzu Kasivita gave a death toll of 36, while local sources put it at 44.

According to local officials, the death toll rose to over 39 killed in the following days, with a large amount injured. Some residents of Mukondi returned after the attack. Congolese army spokesman Anthony Mualushayi stated that the Mukondi attack was carried out in reprisal to a Congolese operation arresting 22 ADF militants and pharmacies allegedly supplying them with bomb-making chemicals.

The Islamic State, which the ADF is a part of, released a statement claiming responsibility for the attacking and claiming it killed "Christians". Mukondi chief Deogratias Kasereka claimed that per modus operandi of the ADF, no guns were used in the attack.

See also
2020 Democratic Republic of the Congo attacks
2021–2022 Democratic Republic of the Congo attacks
Kivu conflict

References

2023 murders in the Democratic Republic of the Congo
Allied Democratic Forces
March 2023 crimes
March 2023 events in Africa
Massacres in 2023
Massacres in the Democratic Republic of the Congo
North Kivu